The Scutari Corps, Işkodra Corps or Shkodër Corps of the Ottoman Empire (Turkish: İşkodra Kolordusu) was one of the corps under the command of the Ottoman Western Army. It was formed in Scutari (present day: Shkodër) area during the First Balkan War.

Balkan Wars

Order of Battle, October 19, 1912 
On October 19, 1912, the corps was structured as follows:

Scutari Corps HQ (Montenegrin Front, under the command of the Western Army, commander: Kurmay Miralay Hasan Riza Bey, chief of staff: Kurmay Kaymakam Abdurrahman Nafiz Bey)
24th Division (commander: Kurmay Miralay Hasan Riza Bey)
70th Infantry Regiment
71st Infantry Regiment
72nd Infantry Regiment
24th Artillery Regiment
24th Rifle Battalion
Elbesan Redif Division (commander: Kurmay Miralay Djemal Bey, chief of staff: Staff Captain Asim Bey)
Elbasan Redif Regiment (commander: Staff Captain Omer Efendi)
Elbasan Redif Battalion
Libraşt Redif Battalion
Gramış Redif Battalion
Tiran Redif Regiment (commander: Staff Captain Edhem Efendi)
Tiran Redif Battalion
Erzen Redif Battalion
Akçahisar Redif Battalion 
Berat Redif Regiment (commander: Staff Captain Arif Efendi)
Berat Redif Battalion
Devol Redif Battalion
Skrapar Redif Battalion
Draç Redif Regiment (commander: Staff Captain M. Salim Efendi)
Draç Redif Battalion
Peklin Redif Battalion 
Kavala Redif Battalion
Bosna Redif Battalion
Provisional Regular Division (commander: Kurmay Miralay Sadik Bey, chief of staff: Staff Captain Sherif Bey)
3rd battalion of the 50th Infantry Regiment 
1st battalion of the 51st Infantry Regiment
1st and 2nd battalions of the 53rd Infantry Regiment
54th Infantry Regiment
Scutari Fortified Area Command
Debre Redif Battalion
Debre-i Bâlâ Redif Battalion
Debre-i Zîr Redif Battalion
Mat Redif Battalion
Rakalar Redif Battalion

Sources

Corps of the Ottoman Empire
Military units and formations of the Ottoman Empire in the Balkan Wars
Ottoman Albania
Ottoman period in the history of Montenegro
History of Shkodër
1912 establishments in the Ottoman Empire